The French as Seen by... (Les Français vus par... in French)  was the title and subject of a series of five short films by notable directors. It was initiated and sponsored by the newspaper Le Figaro, as part of the 1988 celebration of the tenth anniversary of its magazine section. The directors and films produced were:

Werner Herzog - Les Gaulois
David Lynch - The Cowboy and the Frenchman
Andrzej Wajda - Proust contre la déchéance
Luigi Comencini - Pèlerinage à Agen
Jean-Luc Godard - Le dernier mot

External links

Le Figaro magazine

1988 films
French anthology films
1988 short films
French short films